Monika and the Sixteen Year Olds (German: Monika und die Sechzehnjährigen) is a 1975 West German sex comedy film directed by Charly Steinberger and featuring Teri Tordai, Liselotte Pulver and Klausjürgen Wussow.

Synopsis
A group of teenage girls at a boarding school all fall in love with the son of the director, but are alarmed when they discover he has plans to become a priest and renounce woman entirely.

Cast
 Marie Zürer as Monika 
 Oliver Collignon as Johannes 
 Liselotte Pulver as Annelie, die Frau Direktorin 
 Klausjürgen Wussow as Monsignore Victor Berend 
 Judith Moser as Bettina 
 Silke Klose as Sylvie 
 Carina Kreisch as Uschi 
 Teri Tordai as Mutter
 Hilde Banser as Fanny

References

Bibliography 
 Terri Ginsberg & Andrea Mensch. A Companion to German Cinema. John Wiley & Sons, 2012.

External links 
 

1975 films
1970s sex comedy films
German sex comedy films
West German films
1970s German-language films
1975 comedy films
1970s German films